The Bridgwater Times was a free weekly newspaper, for Bridgwater, Somerset, England.

It was owned by Northcliffe Media, part of the Daily Mail and General Trust newsgroup. It closed in 2011.

References

Northcliffe Media
Newspapers published in Somerset
Bridgwater